Lesná is a municipality and village in Tachov District in the Plzeň Region of the Czech Republic. It has about 500 inhabitants.

Administrative parts
Villages and hamlets of Háje, Písařova Vesce and Stará Knížecí Huť are administrative parts of Lesná.

Geography

The municipality lies on the border with Germany and is adjacent to German municipalities of Bärnau, Flossenbürg and Georgenberg.

Lesná lies in the Upper Palatine Forest mountain range. In the eastern part of the municipal territory there is the source of the Kateřinský Stream, the headwater of the Pfreimd River. Most of the territory consists of extensive forests, about three-quarters of the territory is protected as the Český les Protected Landscape Area. There are also several small-scaled protected areas, including the Pavlova Huť Nature Reserve.

History

The first written mention of Lesná is from 1348, when the king sold the village with the church to Arkleb of Tisová. From 1523, it was located on a trade route from the Kingdom of Bohemia to the Bavarian Upper Palatinate region, which brought prosperity to the village. In the 16th century, it was referred to as a market town. In the second half of the 16th century, Lesná was acquired by the Schirndinger family, who (along with their descendants the Dobřenský family) owned the estate until 1945.

Around 1600, Paul Schürer bought an area in the woods in what is today the southwestern part of the municipality. He founded the village of Zahájí (German: Waldheim) and ran a glass factory there. He then received the title of a knight from the hands of Emperor Rudolf II and had built a castle. The castle was abandoned in 1780 and replaced by a new one, which was inhabited until the 20th century.

From 1938 to 1945, the territory was annexed by Nazi Germany and administered as part of Reichsgau Sudetenland. After the World War II, the German population was expelled. Several settlements immediately at the frontier with West Germany, including Zahájí, were abandoned and became a restricted zone after the implementation of the Iron Curtain. The entire village of Zahájí, including the castle, was razed to the ground in the 1950s.

Transport
There are two pedestrian border crossings with Germany: Přední Zahájí / Waldheiml and Křížový Kámen / Kreuzstein.

Sights
The Church of Saint Nicholas is a landmark of Lesná. It was originally a Gothic church, baroque rebuilt in 1728 and 1774.

Construction of the baroque Lešná Castle was finished in 1787. Today it is the seat of the municipal office.

Ruin of the Zahájí Castle is located in the forests near the Czech-German border. Only several fragments have been preserved.

References

External links

Villages in Tachov District